Endotricha consocia is a species of snout moth in the genus Endotricha. It was described by Arthur Gardiner Butler in 1879, and is known from Japan, Taiwan and China (Beijing, Fujian, Guangxi, Hebei, Henan, Hubei, Jiangsu, Jiangxi, Zhejiang).

References

Moths described in 1879
Endotrichini
Moths of Japan